Fredrik Størmer may refer to:

 Fredrik Carl Mülertz Størmer, Norwegian mathematician and geophysicist
 Fredrik Carl Størmer, Norwegian jazz artiste
 Henrik Christian Fredrik Størmer, Norwegian engineer